Calvin Bassey (born 31 December 1999) is a professional footballer who plays as a left-back or a centre-back for Eredivisie club Ajax and the Nigeria national team.

Bassey is a product of Leicester City's youth system but didn't make a senior appearance for the club before joining Rangers on a free transfer in July 2020. He made 65 appearances over two seasons for Rangers and won the Scottish Premiership and the Scottish Cup. In July 2022, he signed for Dutch club Ajax, with Rangers receiving the highest transfer fee in their history.

Bassey was born in Italy but has represented Nigeria at international level since making his debut in a 2022 FIFA World Cup qualification game against Ghana in March 2022.

Club career

Leicester City
Bassey joined Leicester City at the age of 15 after a successful trial and progressed through the club's youth ranks, with regular appearances for the clubs' under-18 and under-23 sides.

Rangers
On 6 June 2020, Bassey signed a pre-contract with Rangers, with him due to officially join the club with the opening of the summer transfer window in July. On 9 August 2020, he made his professional debut for Rangers in a Scottish Premiership match versus St Mirren as a substitute in a 3–0 win. 

Bassey was a key figure for Rangers during their run to the 2022 UEFA Europa League Final, which they lost on penalties to Eintracht Frankfurt.

Ajax
In July 2022, it was confirmed by Rangers that Bassey had been sold to Ajax for a club record fee of around £20 million. On his debut for the club in the 2022 Johan Cruyff Shield (Dutch Super Cup) on 31 July 2022, he received a direct red card 15 minutes after coming on as a substitute.

International career
Born in Italy, Bassey was eligible to play for Italy, Nigeria or England at international level.

In 2021, Bassey committed his international future to Nigeria when he accepted a call up for their 2022 FIFA World Cup Qualifiers. He debuted with Nigeria in a 0–0 2022 FIFA World Cup qualification tie with Ghana on 25 March 2022.

Personal life
Calvin Bassey is the brother of English rapper Y.CB, whose real name is Matthew Bassey, who makes music under UK drill group 7th.

Career statistics

Club

International

Honours
Rangers
Scottish Premiership: 2020–21
Scottish Cup: 2021–22
 UEFA Europa League runner-up: 2021–22

Individual
UEFA Europa League Team of the Season: 2021–22

References

External links
Profile at the AFC Ajax website

1999 births
Living people
People from Aosta
Nigerian footballers
Nigeria international footballers
Italian footballers
Association football defenders
Scottish Professional Football League players
Eredivisie players
Leicester City F.C. players
Rangers F.C. players
AFC Ajax players
Italian people of Nigerian descent
Italian emigrants to the United Kingdom
Italian sportspeople of African descent
Footballers from Aosta Valley
Nigerian expatriate footballers
Expatriate footballers in the Netherlands 
Nigerian expatriate sportspeople in the Netherlands